Oliver Tracy Johns  (August 21, 1879 – June 17, 1961) was an American Major League Baseball pitcher. He was born in Trenton, Ohio. He played in four games for the 1905 Cincinnati Reds. He is buried with his wife Nina in the Miltonville Cemetery in Miltonville, Ohio.

External links

1879 births
1961 deaths
Cincinnati Reds players
Major League Baseball pitchers
Baseball players from Ohio
Dayton Veterans players
Boone Coal Miners players
Omaha Rourkes players
People from Trenton, Ohio